Sarah Murdoch (born 31 May 1972) is a British-Australian model, actress, and television presenter.

Career
Raised in Sydney, Australia, Murdoch studied at Strathfield's The McDonald College of the Performing Arts, where she studied ballet.

Her modelling career began at the age of 17, after being signed to Vivien's Management in Sydney. Soon after she moved to Paris and started working as a runway model for Karl Lagerfeld, Issey Miyake, Chanel, Emanuel Ungaro, Gianfranco Ferré, Givenchy, Alberta Ferretti, Kenzo, Valentino and Oscar de la Renta. She appeared in campaigns for Bonds, L'Oréal, Revlon, Ralph Lauren, Yves Saint Laurent, and Estée Lauder, as well as the 1999 and 2003 Sports Illustrated Swimsuit issues. Her magazine covers include Vogue, Elle, Marie Claire, Glamour, GQ and Harper's Bazaar. She has appeared on magazine issue covers in Australia, Spain, the United Kingdom, and the United States.

In October 2013, Murdoch was a guest host on the Seven Network's Weekend Sunrise.

Murdoch starred with fellow model Shalom Harlow in the romantic comedy Head Over Heels. She also appeared in an episode of the sitcom, Friends (S07E07).

Today 
Murdoch filled in for Jessica Rowe on the Nine Network's popular morning news and interview show, Today while Rowe was taking four months maternity leave.

On 26 March 2007, it was reported in The Sydney Morning Herald that Murdoch would finish up her hosting duties on Today and stepped down on 30 March 2007. Nine News presenter Kellie Sloane replaced Murdoch until May 2007, when Lisa Wilkinson took over as the new co-host on Today.

Murdoch returned as a guest host on the 4 October 2007, alongside Karl Stefanovic, to raise awareness of breast cancer as she is a patron of the National Breast Cancer Foundation.

Australia's Next Top Model
Murdoch replaced Jodhi Meares as host of Australia's Next Top Model after Meares infamously blundered her way through the third season's live finale in 2007 and flat-out refused to appear in 2008's finale. In addition to hosting Top Model and an executive producer on the show, Murdoch also signed a deal with Foxtel to create documentaries with her production company, Room 329 Productions. She experienced media scrutiny during the 2010 Australia's Next Top Model Grand Final for announcing an incorrect winner. On 12 December 2011, Murdoch announced that she was leaving Top Model after three seasons.

Pride of Australia
Screened in November 2009, Murdoch and her production company Room 329 Productions, along with Foxtel, produced 4 episodes of Pride of Australia with Murdoch herself as host. The program tells inspiring stories of everyday Australians exhibiting acts of great courage, love and determination when faced with adversity. The stories were taken from thousands of people nominated to News Limited papers across Australia.

Everybody Dance Now
Murdoch hosted the Network Ten reality dance programme Everybody Dance Now in August 2012; however, due to poor ratings, the series was axed after just four episodes.

Personal life
In 1999, the then-Sarah O'Hare married British-born Lachlan Murdoch, the eldest son of Australian-born American media mogul Rupert Murdoch. The couple reside in Brentwood, Los Angeles, California, with their two sons, Kalan Alexander (born 2004), Aidan Patrick (born 2006) and their daughter, Aerin Elisabeth Murdoch (born 2010).

She is also ambassador of the Murdoch Children's Research Institute and joined its board of directors in 2014. The institute was established in 1986 by her husband Lachlan's grandmother, Elisabeth Murdoch and is the largest child health research institute in Australia. Murdoch is patron of Australia's National Breast Cancer Foundation, and addressed the National Press Club of Australia about the activities of the foundation on 4 October 2006 and again on 24 December 2008. The addresses were televised Australia-wide by the Australian Broadcasting Corporation. Murdoch is a keen rugby league fan and supports the Manly Sea Eagles.

References

External links

 
 
 Sarah Murdoch Harper's BAZAAR photo shoot (May 2009)

1972 births
Living people
Sarah
Australian television presenters
Models from Sydney
Australian female models
English emigrants to Australia
Naturalised citizens of Australia
Everybody Dance Now
Australian expatriates in the United States
People from Brentwood, Los Angeles
Australian women television presenters
Actresses from Sydney